The Ebbe Mountains or Ebbe form a range of uplands up to  high in the German state of  North Rhine-Westphalia. They have given their name to the Ebbe Mountain Nature Park and are part of the Süder Uplands within the Rhine Massif.

Geography

Location 
The Ebbe lies in the Sauerland in the districts of Märkischer Kreis and Olpe. It stretches between Herscheid and Plettenberg (outside the area) in the north, Attendorn and Finnentrop (outside the area) in the east, the Biggesee in the south and Kierspe and Meinerzhagen in the west, where the Ebbe Hills are surrounded by the Ebbe Hills Nature Park. It is grazed by the A 45 motorway in the west.

Hills
The highest elevation in the Ebbe Mountains is the Nordhelle between Valbert and Herscheid. Other notable hills are the: Rehberg (645.9 m), Rüenhardt (636.0 m), Waldberg (ca. 635 m), Rothenstein (ca. 600 m), Der Griesing (552,6 m), Homert (538,3 m) and Kahler Kopf (540.1 m).

Rivers and lakes
The following rivers rise in the Ebbe or around its edges: the Bruchbach, Else, Fürwigge, Ihne, Lister, Oesterbach, Verse and Volme. Within the Ebbe and its foothills are the Ahaus Reservoir, the Biggesee and the Fürwigge, Jubach, Lister, Oester and Verse Dams.

References

External links
 Ebbe Hills Nature Park

Sauerland
Central Uplands
Mountain ranges of North Rhine-Westphalia
Natural regions of the Süder Uplands